Radha Prakash Yadav (born 21 April 2000) is an Indian cricketer. She plays for Mumbai, Baroda and West zone. She has played 4 First-class, 13 List A and 16 Women's Twenty20 matches. She made her debut in major domestic cricket on 10 January 2015 against Kerala.

Early life 
She was born prematurely in the fourth month in Kandivli (West), Mumbai. She lives in a 225 sq. ft. house, behind her father's vegetable stall, which is placed outside the society which was redeveloped under the Slum Redevelopment Area (SRA) scheme. Her father Shri Omprakash Yadav originally belongs to Jaunpur district of Uttar Pradesh.  She started playing cricket in the society's compound with boys, where her coach, Prafful Naik, noticed her and has been training her, since she was 12 years old. He shifted her from Anandibai Damodar Kale Vidyalaya to Our Lady of Remedy (Kandivali) in 2013 She went to Vidya Kunj School.

Career 
She made her Women's Twenty20 International cricket (WT20I) debut for India Women against South Africa Women on 13 February 2018.

In October 2018, she was named in India's squad for the 2018 ICC Women's World Twenty20 tournament in the West Indies. She was the joint-leading wicket-taker for India in the tournament, with eight dismissals in five matches.

In January 2020, she was named in India's squad for the 2020 ICC Women's T20 World Cup in Australia.

On Nov 9, 2020, during final match of Women's T20 Challenge 2020, between Trailblazers Vs Supernovas, she become the first T20 player of Women's T20 Challenge to take 5 wicket haul.

In February 2021, she was named in India's Women's One Day International (WODI) squad for their series against South Africa. She made her Women's One Day International (WODI) debut for India, against South Africa, on 14 March 2021.

In May 2021, she was named in India's Test squad for their one-off match against the England women's cricket team.

She plays for Sydney Sixers in the 2021 Women's Big Bash League.  In July 2022, she was named in India's team for the cricket tournament at the 2022 Commonwealth Games in Birmingham, England.

References

External links

 

2000 births
Living people
Mumbai women cricketers
Baroda women cricketers
West Zone women cricketers
IPL Supernovas cricketers
IPL Velocity cricketers
Delhi Capitals (WPL) cricketers
Sydney Sixers (WBBL) cricketers
India women One Day International cricketers
India women Twenty20 International cricketers
Cricketers at the 2022 Commonwealth Games
Commonwealth Games silver medallists for India
Commonwealth Games medallists in cricket
Medallists at the 2022 Commonwealth Games